The governing Quebec Liberal Party fielded a full slate of 125 candidates in the 1994 Quebec general election and elected forty-seven candidates, falling to official opposition status in the National Assembly of Quebec.

Candidates

Fabre: Lise Evoy
Lise Evoy received 16,570 votes (41.52%), finishing second against Parti Québécois candidate Joseph Facal. She previously served on the Commission scolaire de Chomedey-Laval.

Labelle: Marcel Lafleur
Marcel Lafleur received 8,494 votes (31.68%), finishing second against Parti Québécois incumbent Jacques Léonard.

Mercier: Alda Viero
Alda Viero was born in Italy and grew up in Montreal. A published poet, she was a travel agency operator in 1994 and campaigned in support of Canadian federalism. She received 9,479 votes (30.55%), finishing second against Parti Québécois candidate Robert Perreault.

References

1994